Radiation hybrid mapping (also known as RH mapping) is a technique for mapping mammalian chromosomes.

Radiation hybrid mapping consists of several steps. First of all, desired chromosomes are broken into several segments with X-rays, after which they are implanted in rodent cells, which clone the chromosomes. Then these clones are analyzed for the presence of certain DNA markers. If two given DNA markers are far apart on the initial chromosome, then it is likely that they will appear in distinct fragments. The frequency of the separation of the markers into different fragments is used to estimate the chromosomal distance between them. The RH procedure was used to map 14 DNA probes from a region of human chromosome 21 spanning 20 megabase pairs.

References

Chromosomes